All of a Sudden is a 2016 German drama film directed by Aslı Özge. It was shown in the Panorama section at the 66th Berlin International Film Festival.

Cast
 Sebastian Hülk as Karsten
 Julia Jentsch as Laura
 Hanns Zischler as Klaus
 Sascha Alexander Gersak as Andrej
 Luise Heyer as Judith
 Lea Draeger as Caro
 Natalia Belitski as Anna

References

External links
 

2016 films
2016 drama films
German drama films
2010s German-language films
2010s German films